This is the first edition of the event. Similar to singles, 2nd seeds Rameez Junaid and Frank Moser defeated top seeds Dustin Brown and Philipp Marx to win the title.

Seeds

Draw

Draw

References
 Main Draw

Maserati Challenger - Doubles
2013 Doubles
Zucchetti